The 2018 Women's International Tournament of Spain was the 22nd edition of the Women's International Tournament Of Spain, held in Alicante, Spain between 23–25 November as a friendly handball tournament organised by the Royal Spanish Handball Federation as a preparation of the host nation to the 2018 European Women's Handball Championship.

Results

Round robin
All times are local (UTC+1).

Final standing

References

External links
RFEBM Official Website

International Tournament of Spain
2018–19 in Spanish handball
Handball competitions in Spain
November 2018 sports events in Spain